Karlsplatz Stadtbahn Station is a former station of the Viennese Stadtbahn. The buildings above ground on Karlsplatz are a well-known example of Jugendstil architecture. These buildings were included in The Vienna Secession, as they followed many of the artistic styles of that movement. They were designed by Otto Wagner, adviser to the Transport Commission in Vienna, and Joseph Maria Olbrich and are, unlike the other Stadtbahn stations, made of a steel framework with marble slabs mounted on the exterior. These stations allowed Otto Wagner to achieve his goal of creating two modern axes of architecture in a city that was becoming one of the most modern cities of its time. These buildings went on to become the most modern monument of the modern city.
Architectural critic and poet Friedrich Achleitner commented on the Stadtbahn stations as follows "...In these two station buildings Wagner reached a highpoint of his dialectic (in his planning of the Stadtbahn) between function and poetry, construction and decoration, whereby a severe rationalism engages in competition with an almost Secessionist kind of decoration." 

When the Stadtbahn line was converted to U-Bahn in 1981, the original station was scheduled to be demolished. As a result of public outcry, it was decided to keep the station buildings. Both buildings were disassembled, renovated, and then reassembled  higher than their original location after completion of U-Bahn construction. One of the buildings is now used as an exhibition space by the Vienna Museum, with an U-Bahn entrance in its rear; the other is used as a café.

Notes

References 

 * "Architecture in Austria in the 20th and 21st Centuries". Ed. Gudrun Hausegger. Basel, SW: Birkhäuser Verlag, 2006. 
 * Borsi, Franco, and Ezio Godoli. "Vienna 1900 Architecture and Design". New York, NY: Rizzoli International Publications, Inc., 1986. 
 * Arnanson, Harvard H. "History of Modern Art". Ed. Daniel Wheeler. 3rd ed. Englewood Cliffs, NJ: Prentice Hall, Inc., 1986. 

Art Nouveau architecture in Vienna
Buildings and structures in Innere Stadt
Buildings and structures in Wieden
Railway stations opened in 1899
Transport in Vienna
Art Nouveau railway stations
Otto Wagner buildings
1899 establishments in Austria
19th-century architecture in Austria